Gabino Ezeiza, nicknamed Negro (February 3, 1858 – October 12, 1916), was an Argentine musician. Ezeiza was one of the greatest performers in the art of the payada. He became renowned, both in his native land and in Uruguay, after a memorable encounter with Oriental payador Juan de Nava, who carried at the time a certain halo of invincibility. This celebrated contest was held in the city of Paysandú on July 23, 1884, in front of one of the largest crowds ever to gather for a payada duel (in Argentina July 23 is established as the "Day of the Payador" in commemoration of this event).

Ezeiza was eventually proclaimed the winner with the improvisation of his famous "Saludo a Paysandú". A recording of this song is the only existing record of Ezeiza's voice. He went on to become one of the greatest payadores in the history of the art form (alongside, amongst others, Santos Vega). He was also well known for his sense of humor.

Biography 
Gabino Ezeiza was an afro-Argentine born in the San Telmo barrio (a former slave neighborhood), and lived at a time when there were a considerable number of black Afro-descendants in the area of present-day Greater Buenos Aires. His teacher in the initiation of the payada was also afro-Argentine Pancho Luna.

Ezeiza was one of the most famous "payadores, both in his homeland and in Uruguay. His counterpoints became famous and the one held on July 23, 1884, at the Artigas Theater in Montevideo with the oriental singer Juan de Nava is remembered, witnessed by a large auditorium. In that meeting, Ezeiza improvised there what would become the popular song Heroico Paysandú, with which he defeated Nava, becoming one of the most important payadores in history. The day July 23 was declared "Payador's Day" throughout the territory of the Argentine Republic in honor of that historic counterpoint.

Ezeiza had memorable payadas with other rioplatense singers such as Nemesio Trejo (1880), Puanes e Hidalgo (unknown date), Pablo Vázquez (at Teatro Florida in Pergamino, 1894), Arturo de Nava (at Circo Anselmi), Cazón (both in 1896), Luis García (1900 in San Antonio de Areco).

Carlos Gardel and José Razzano met Ezeiza in the political committees, in particular, for his work in the committees of the Radical Civic Union adhering to the movement led at the time Hipólito Yrigoyen, a story told in the film El último payador, whose script was written by tango lyricist Homero Manzi. He made friends at the popular Café de los Angelitos in Buenos Aires. Upon his death, the duo sang Heroico Paysandú in his tribute, which years later led to the Gardel album.

Ezeiza was also in jail for political reasons (according to the 1895 census data). After Argentina and Chile signed a peace treaty in May 1902 that established the present-day boundaries between both countries, Ezeiza toured on the south of Argentina. In 1905, he married Petrona del Carmen Peñaloza, whom he had met during his shows in San Nicolás de los Arroyos.

Ezeiza died in his house in Flores, Buenos Aires, on October 12, 1912. According to his doctor, the cause of death was endocarditis.

 Contribution to Argentine folklore 

There are those who consider that Ezeiza was the one who introduced the milonga rhythm to payada, and its popularity caused other payadores to spread it to other areas of Argentina, Uruguay, and Brazil (on all in the south of this country).

Ezeiza affirmed that the milonga (campera) came from the candombe, a style of music and dance that originated in Uruguay among the descendants of liberated African slaves.

In an interview to Argentine payador and journalist Nemesio Trejo, published in the newspaper La Opinión'' of Avellaneda on April 15, 1916, he recounts:

Ezeiza considered that the milonga rhythm would have been an evolution, in classical guitar (named "creole guitar" in Argentina), of Afro-Argentine candombe carried out by Afro-Argentines in the Argentine Pampas.

References

External links

 

1858 births
1916 deaths
Afro-Argentine musicians
Afro-Argentine culture
Argentine musicians
Argentine songwriters
Male songwriters
Argentine people of Angolan descent
Burials at San José de Flores Cemetery
Musicians from Buenos Aires